Santanu Bhowmik (12 January 1989–20 September 2017) was a journalist murdered in the North-eastern state of Tripura in India while covering the raasta roko (road blockade) by Indigenous People's Front of Tripura (IPFT). 

Santanu worked for Channel Dinraat television station and was covering a clash at Mandai between the indigenous wing of the ruling Communist Party of India (Marxist) and IPFT activists in which Bhowmik was suddenly attacked with sharp weapons.

He was later found with multiple stab injuries and died before he could be taken to a hospital. Police arrested four members of the IPFT in connection with the murder.

Santanu's father Sadhan Bhowmik has demanded that Central Bureau of Investigation probe the death.

See also
 Sudip Datta Bhaumik
 List of journalists killed in India

References

External links
 A Tripura journalist slain: Anatomy of a murder
 Why was Santanu Bhowmik killed?
 This Is What Happened Before Tripura Journalist's Murder: Police Sources

1989 births
2017 deaths
Journalists from Tripura
Assassinated Indian journalists